Psychrolutes microporos is a species of deepwater marine fish in the family Psychrolutidae, commonly known as a blobfish or fathead. It is found in the abyssal zone in waters around Australia and New Zealand.

Discovery 
A specimen of Psychrolutes microporos was trawled by the RV James Cook and Doctor Ignacio Hernández Ricordi in 1983 and described by Joseph Nelson in 1995. The holotype is in the Museum of New Zealand.

Description
Psychrolutes microporos is a whitish colour and is flattened laterally, with a wide mouth. Blobfish which are pulled up from the depths too quickly suffer severe tissue damage because of the drastic drop in pressure, and morph into an unsightly gelatinous mass (hence the name "blobfish") with a prominent proboscis. Blobfish in their natural deep-sea habitat have a completely different appearance, recognizably piscine, compact, and with no proboscis. Blobfish can support extremely high pressures in the deep ocean, when compared to pressures closer to the surface of the ocean.

Distribution
Psychrolutes microporos is found in the abyssal depths between the Australian mainland and Tasmania. Two specimens were collected in the month-long NORFANZ Expedition of 2003 which was examining the biodiversity of the seamounts and slopes of the Norfolk Ridge. They averaged 1.7 kg (4 lb) and were found in a single location.

Biology
The texture of Psychrolutes microporos's body is gelatinous, a feature often found in deep sea fish. Little is known of its behaviour because of the difficulty of observing it in its natural habitat. It is thought to be an ambush predator, consuming anything edible that comes within its reach. Due to the species' gelatinous composition, it has been found to be able to absorb arsenic toxins found in water on a nanoscopic level.

References

microporos
Fish of the Pacific Ocean
Fish described in 1995
Taxa named by Joseph S. Nelson